Salas de los Infantes is a municipality and city located in Burgos Province between La Rioja, Soria and Burgos in Spain. It is hilly with many foothills and mountains. The mountain range Sierra de la Demanda with the black lagoon, La Laguna Negra, is nearby.

People from Salas de los Infantes
Manuel Quintano Bonifaz (1699–1774) - Cleric and Grand Inquisitor of Spain from 1755 to 1774.

See also
Arroyo de Salas
Hoyuelos de la Sierra
Nuestra Señora de la Vega

References

Salas de los Infantes